Jaggubhai is a 2010 Indian Tamil-language action drama film written and directed by K. S. Ravikumar, who with collaborates with the lead actor, Sarath Kumar for their ninth film. Also starring Shriya Saran, debutant Srisha and veteran comedian Goundamani; the film is produced by Sarath Kumar's wife, Raadhika and Punit Goenka. The film has music composed by Rafee, whilst cinematography is handled by R. D. Rajesekhar and the film is edited by Don Max. The film is a remake of the 2001 French film Wasabi.

The plot follows the journey of a tough Indian police officer, fondly known as "Jaggubhai", who is sent to Australia on an important mission to deal with anti-social elements there. The film, originally launched as a Rajinikanth-starrer in May 2004, resurfaced in May 2008 with a new cast with changes to the story. Shooting started months later, and took place in various locations: Melbourne, Australia; Kuala Lumpur, Malaysia, Bangkok, Thailand and Chennai, India being primary locations. Most scenes portraying Australia were shot in Malaysia.

Prior to release, the film was controversially leaked online and printed as DVDs, with subsequent actions causing a media uproar in the film industry. The film then re-shot the climax and premiered in Chennai to the most-well attended movie premiere in recent times on 27 January 2010. The film was a flop at Box Office.

Plot
Jagannathan, fondly known as Jaggubhai, is an upright, straightforward, and tough Indian police officer with sharp methods. His way of dealing with the criminals strikes terror in the underground world. Jaggubhai is sent to Australia on an important mission to deal with antisocial elements there. In Australia, he meets Ilavarasi, and they fall in love with each other. Jaggubhai fails in his mission for which he came to Australia, and the brief romance with Ilavarasi also ends abruptly. Jaggubhai returns to India as a dejected officer, failing in both his official duty and personal life. However, fate had something in store for him. 20 years later, or as he says it 21 years later, he gets a call from Australia stating that Ilavarasi is dead and has left him a will. He reaches Australia and is shocked to know that the brief encounter with Ilavarasi had resulted in a daughter named Monisha, who is now a teenager. Jaggubhai realizes that he has left behind his daughter and her wish that he should protect her. Monisha thinks he is her mother's friend and tries to act cranky. The threat comes in the form of some antisocial elements who want to eliminate Monisha. These thugs were the same ones who had tricked Jaggubhai 21 years earlier and who had killed Ilavarasi. Now, it is Jaggubhai's duty to save his only daughter and settle old scores with the thugs. He now meets his former colleague Kaaliyappan or MIB. With his help, he kills the thugs and their leader Hamid Ansari (Richard Raj). Monisha then accepts Jaggubhai as her father.

Cast
 Sarath Kumar as Jagannathan (Jaggubhai)
 Shriya Saran as Monisha Jagannathan
 Srisha as Ilavarasi Jagannathan
 Kiran Rathod as Sumathi
 Goundamani as Kaaliyappan (MIB-Man in Black)
 Richard Raj as Hamid Ansari
 Vijayakumar as Police Commissioner and Jagannathan's father
 S. V. S. Kumar as Ilavarasi's father
 Manimaran Thorasamy as Manimaran
 Neelima Rani as Priya
 Mahendran as Monisha's boyfriend
 K. S. Ravikumar in a Special appearance

Production

Development
In mid-2004, K. S. Ravikumar planned a film under the title Jaggubhai with the proposed cast including Rajinikanth in the lead role playing a terrorist. Aishwarya Rai was finalized to play the female lead role, after initial expectations that Rani Mukerji or Jyothika would portray the role. The film which was set to have music composed by A.R. Rahman, had a photo shoot and was touted to be Rajinikanth's comeback film after the debacle of Baba in 2002. Shortly after, however, Rajinikanth was signed up for Chandramukhi, directed by P. Vasu. With the progress of Chandramukhi, Jaggubhai was delayed and subsequently shelved. Since it was shelved, Ravikumar went to direct Varalaru with Ajith Kumar in 2006 and the high-budget Dasavathaaram with Kamal Haasan. During the post-production of Dasavathaaram, Ravikumar announced that he would restart his shelved project, Jaggubhai with a different cast.

Casting
Sarath Kumar was signed to play the dual lead role, becoming the tenth collaboration between the director and the actor. Sneha, who was picked to portray the mother in the film, opted out due to her discontent in being the mother of the lead heroine. Despite early indications that Sarath Kumar's real-life stepdaughter, Rayan, would portray the role of the daughter, Shriya Saran secured the role. Saran who had met commercial success with Sivaji: The Boss was then requested to portray dual roles in the film, however, she rejected the opportunity, citing that she will only play a single role. After approaching Simran, Padmapriya Janakiraman, Kamalini Mukerji and Vimala Raman for the role, Bollywood actress Tabu agreed to do the mother's role, demanding a sum of 75 lakhs but later walked out of the role. Newcomer Srisha was later handed that certain role. Kiran Rathod was also handed a role in the film, which is touted to be the first of her comeback. Veteran comedian, Goundamani also plays a role in the project.

Rafee was signed as the music director and Jacki as the art director of the film while Sarathkumar's home production company Radaan Mediaworks and Zee Motion Pictures collaborated to produce the film.

Internet piracy
A full-length, unfinished version of Jaggubhai was discovered online on 31 December 2009, far from the film's official release date. The leaked copy has some unfinished effects shots and does not contain any voice-overs or dubs. The film's producer Raadhika, the film's star and SIFAA president R. Sarathkumar, and K. S. Ravikumar held a press meet condemning the film's piracy, in which the former two had become emotional during the discussion. The press meet was supported by Rajinikanth, Kamal Haasan and Surya Sivakumar.

Release
The satellite rights of the film were sold to Zee Thamizh. The film was given a "U/A" certificate by the Indian Censor Board.

Reception
Jaggubhai had a well-attended premiere on 27 January 2010 at a popular multiplex in Chennai, with the event being dubbed as the most well-attended film premiere of all time for a Tamil film. The film released two days later, amidst much competition and opened in most centres across Chennai, Tamil Nadu as well as in various regions overseas to an average opening. The film grossed Rs. 9,19,564 in the opening weekend in Chennai and was declared an average film.

Reviews
Upon release, the film generally received mixed to negative reviews from film critics. Rediff.com gave a very negative review of the film criticizing all major aspects of the film from performance to production values labelling K. S. Ravikumar as "the biggest culprit" whilst mentioning that "the screenplay is silliness personified". Sarath Kumar is described as "a major disappointment, despite being given a role that would make any actor go green with envy", whilst Shriya Saran "gains brownie points by looking hot in various skimpy dresses" despite "not [being] successful in acting".

Sify.com was relatively less critical describing the movie as "run of the mill" though citing that the "major plus point of the film is that it is only 2 hours, and the camera work of RD Rajasekhar is scintillating". Sarath Kumar with his "macho tough look carries the film on his shoulders", while Shriya Saran as the spoiled brat is "adequate". Srisha "can’t emote" while Goundamani is a "scream", continued the review.

Soundtrack

The film soundtrack released on 27 September 2009 and was scored by newcomer, Rafee. The album contains seven songs. The songs will be featured throughout the film. Vaali, Na. Muthukumar Kabilan, Kaadhal Mathi and Kalyanji have contributed the lyrics. The album has singer like Shankar Mahadevan, Chinmayi, Suchitra, Maheshwari Rani, Sunitha Sarathy and Rafi.

References

External links
 

2010 films
Indian remakes of French films
2010 action drama films
Films shot in Melbourne
Films directed by K. S. Ravikumar
2010s Tamil-language films
Films set in Melbourne
Fictional Indian police officers
Films shot in Kuala Lumpur
Films shot in Bangkok
Films shot in Chennai
Indian police films